Russia has participated at the Youth Olympic Games in every edition since the inaugural 2010 Games and has earned medals from every edition.

Bids

Unsuccessful Bids

Medal tables

Medals by Summer Games

Medals by Winter Games

Medals by summer sport

Medals by winter sport

Flag bearers

See also
Russia at the Olympics
Russia at the Paralympics

 
Nations at the Youth Olympic Games